Gustave Akueson (born 20 December 1995) is a footballer who plays as a defender for  club Versailles. Born in France, he plays for the Togo national team.

International career
Akueson received first call-up to the Togo national team in May 2021. He made his international debut on 9 October 2021 in a 1–1 World Cup qualifier draw against Congo.

Career statistics

International

Honours 
Versailles

 Championnat National 2: 2021–22

References

External links
 

1995 births
Living people
People from Ermont
Citizens of Togo through descent
Togolese footballers
Togo international footballers
French sportspeople of Togolese descent
French footballers
Association football defenders
Championnat National players
Championnat National 2 players
Championnat National 3 players
JA Drancy players
FC Chambly Oise players
US Granville players
FC Versailles 78 players